Bickham is a surname. Notable people with the surname include:

Charles G. Bickham (1867–1944), United States Army officer
Clint Bickham, American voice actor
Dan Bickham (1864–1951), American baseball player
Ernest Bickham Sweet-Escott (1857–1941), British colonial administrator
George Bickham the Elder (1684–1758), English etcher and engraver
George Bickham the Younger (c. 1706–1771), English etcher and engraver
Jack Bickham (1930–1997), American writer
Moreese Bickham (1917–2016), American anti-death penalty activist

See also
Bickham, a hamlet in the civil parish of Timberscombe, Somerset, England